Events from the year 1382 in Ireland.

Incumbent
Lord: Richard II

Events
Aghaboe Abbey in County Laois is rebuilt by Fighin Fitzpatrick and granted to the Dominican Order.
William Tany, Prior of the Order of St. John of Jerusalem appointed Lord Chancellor of Ireland

Births
・Davi of Irish  (d.1468)

・Dave  Irish(d.14??)

Deaths
 18 October - James Butler, 2nd Earl of Ormonde, Lord Justice of Ireland (b.1331).
 Thomas de Thelwall

 
1380s in Ireland
Ireland
Years of the 14th century in Ireland